Darrel Robert Sutton (July 9, 1947 – August 2, 2018) was a Canadian curler. He played as lead on the Hec Gervais rink that won the 1974 Brier. He owned The Filter Shop in Edmonton, Alberta, Canada.

Personal life
Sutton was born in Lac La Biche, Alberta, Canada, in 1947, to Robert and Beatrice Sutton. He was married to Dorothy Sutton, and lived in Sherwood Park, Alberta. He had two daughters, and four grandchildren. 

He died at the age of 71 on August 2, 2018. About a week before his death, Sutton had a massive stroke which left him paralyzed on one side of his body and unable to talk. He died due to complications from the stroke.

The Filter Shop at BGE
Darrel started his company out of the back of his Ford Falcon station Wagon in 1968, and eventually merged with Bud Guthrie Enterprises (BGE). The Company was known as BGE Service and Supply, The Filter Shop, until 2013, when the name was changed to The Filter Shop at BGE. 

BGE supplies filters and filtration services to Education, Industrial, Government, Oil and Gas, and Residential sectors across western Canada. The Filter Shop has branches in Vancouver, Prince George, Fort McMurray, Calgary, Saskatoon, Winnipeg, and a corporate office in Edmonton.

One of his former employees was Mike Benoit (now retired), father of WWE star Chris Benoit.

References

External links
 
 
 Darrel Sutton – Curling Canada Stats Archive

Brier champions
Curlers from Alberta
1947 births
2018 deaths
Canadian male curlers
Sportspeople from Sherwood Park
People from Lac La Biche County